The CONCACAF Gold Cup is North America's major tournament in senior men's football and determines the continental champion. Until 1989, the tournament was known as CONCACAF Championship. It is currently held every two years. From 1996 to 2005, nations from other confederations have regularly joined the tournament as invitees. In earlier editions, the continental championship was held in different countries, but since the inception of the Gold Cup in 1991, the United States are constant hosts or co-hosts.

From 1973 to 1989, the tournament doubled as the confederation's World Cup qualification. CONCACAF's representative team at the FIFA Confederations Cup was decided by a play-off between the winners of the last two tournament editions in 2015 via the CONCACAF Cup, but was then discontinued along with the Confederations Cup.

Since the inaugural tournament in 1963, the Gold Cup was held 26 times and has been won by seven different nations, most often by Mexico (11 titles).

South Africa participated once, as invitee, in 2005. After defeating heavyweight Mexico in their first match, they followed up with a row of draws and were eliminated on penalties in the quarter-final against Panama.

Record at the CONCACAF Championship/Gold Cup

Match Overview

2005 Squad

In May 2005, that year's eventual South African league champions, the Kaizer Chiefs, were banned from African club competitions for three years after refusing to play a CAF Cup match in favour of a league match against Bloemfontein. Legally, the players would have been eligible for the CONCACAF Gold Cup but were notably not nominated.

Coach:  Stuart Baxter

References

External links
RSSSF archives and results
Soccerway database

Countries at the CONCACAF Gold Cup
South Africa national soccer team